The Simon Fraser Bridge is a deck truss bridge on Highway 97, spanning the Fraser River in Prince George, British Columbia.  It was originally a two-lane bridge, and was completed in 1963.  It carries approximately 22,000 vehicles per day.  In 2009, a 50 million dollar project to twin the bridge was completed. The new bridge carrying two lanes of northbound traffic is approximately 390 metres in length, whereas the two lanes of southbound traffic are directed across the original bridge.

The bridge was named to honour the fur trader and explorer Simon Fraser, who established the town of Prince George, and who descended the river from near this spot in 1805.

See also
 List of crossings of the Fraser River
 List of bridges in Canada

References

Bridges completed in 1963
Bridges completed in 2009
Bridges over the Fraser River
Buildings and structures in Prince George, British Columbia
Truss bridges in Canada
Road bridges in British Columbia